Suzanne Elspeth (Suzy) Balogh OAM (born 8 May 1973 in Queanbeyan, New South Wales) is a sport shooter from Australia. Balogh competed at the 2004 Summer Olympics and won a gold medal in Trap. She also competed in the Double Trap event. She also competed in the 2002 Commonwealth Games in Manchester where she won a bronze medal, and the 2006 Games in Melbourne, where she won a gold and a bronze in the Trap events.  She also reached the final of the women's trap at the 2012 Summer Olympics.

References

1973 births
Living people
Australian female sport shooters
Trap and double trap shooters
Shooters at the 2004 Summer Olympics
Shooters at the 2012 Summer Olympics
Olympic gold medalists for Australia
Olympic shooters of Australia
Recipients of the Medal of the Order of Australia
Commonwealth Games gold medallists for Australia
Olympic medalists in shooting
Medalists at the 2004 Summer Olympics
Commonwealth Games bronze medallists for Australia
Shooters at the 2002 Commonwealth Games
Shooters at the 2006 Commonwealth Games
Commonwealth Games medallists in shooting
20th-century Australian women
21st-century Australian women
Medallists at the 2002 Commonwealth Games
Medallists at the 2006 Commonwealth Games